Qarat aṭ-Ṭūbīyah is a locality and area of marshes located in Tunisia with an elevation above sea level of 214 meters. There are ruins from the Roman Empire nearby.

See also
 Tubia in Mauretania

References

Populated places in Tunisia